CD-192 or No. 192 was a Type D escort ship of the Imperial Japanese Navy during World War II and later the Republic of China Navy.

History
She was laid down on 5 December 1944 at the Nagasaki shipyard of Mitsubishi Heavy Industries for the benefit of the Imperial Japanese Navy and launched on 30 January 1945. On 28 February 1945, she was completed and commissioned. On 15 August 1945, Japan announced their unconditional surrender and she was turned over to the Allies. On 25 October 1945, she was struck from the Navy List. She was assigned to the Allied Repatriation Service and went on numerous repatriation journeys. 

On 7 July 1947, she was ceded to the Republic of China as a war reparation and renamed Tong An (同安). She was struck from the Naval List in 1960.

References

Bibliography

1945 ships
Type D escort ships
Ships built by Mitsubishi Heavy Industries
Ships of the Republic of China